Black pill may refer to:

Blackpill, a suburban area of Swansea, Wales
The black pill ideology, a fatalist set of beliefs
Black Pill Red Pill, an Australian record label
 Black Pilled, an extended play music album from American rock band Smile Empty Soul

See also
Black (disambiguation)
Red pill (disambiguation)
Blue pill (disambiguation)